V. Gopalakrishnan may refer to:

 V. Gopalakrishnan (Sankarankoil MLA), Indian politician 
 V. Gopalakrishnan (actor) (1933–1998), Indian actor
 V. Gopalakrishnan (mayor),  mayor of Coimbatore, Tamil Nadu
 V. R. Gopalakrishnan, Malayalam film director and story writer
 V. Gopalakrishnan (Mettupalayam MLA), member of the Mettupalayam state assembly